More than just a game is a 2007 semi-documentary film directed by Junaid Ahmed. The film shows how political prisoners on Robben Island in South Africa founded the Makana F.A. in 1966. Alternating interviews with Mark Shinners, Anthony Suze, Sedick Isaacs, Lizo Sitoto and Marcus Solomon are intercut with re-enacted scenes.

Plot
Robben Island is a prison ran by South Africa's apartheid regime. All prisoners there are individuals who have distinguished themselves by fighting this regime in some way. Even so, their personalities, ideals and methods differ big time.

By accident the prisoners became aware they all love football. Seeking for something that might make prison life less unbearable, they agree to ask for permission to play football in their spare time and start to elect representatives. The first applications are rejected but finally the prisoners' persistence pays.

Quickly they learn to organise themselves. Their football league is the umbrella under which the imprisoned individuals can achieve a proper self-administration.  The prison direction finally supports the Makana F.A. by providing them with football clothes and also with a playing field that complied with FIFA regulations.

In spite of their different backgrounds the prisoners' elected leaders demonstrate their ability to debate issues and settle each dissent in a perfectly decent manner. The prison officers recognise that and don't interfere when they testify disputes. They seem to start to understand these people don't need anybody to patronise them.

Finally the founders of the Makana F.A. have served their sentences and leave the prison island. They are released into a country which is about to change forever and will provide them with opportunities to prove their management skills in freedom.

Cast
Presley Chweneyagae as Mark Shinners
Wright Ngubeni as Anthony Suze
Az Abrahams as Sedick Isaacs
Tshepo Maseko as Lizo Sitoto
Merlin Balie as Marcus Solomon
Grant Swanby as Warden Delport
Anelisa Phewa as Pro Malepe
Dean Slater as prison officer Fourie
Ramey Short as prison officer Nel
Junaid Booysen as Dikgang Moseneke
Rea Rangkaka as Freddie Simon
Sizwe Msutu as Harry Gwala

References

External links
 
 
 

2007 films
Films shot in South Africa
Documentary films about apartheid
Documentary films about association football
2007 documentary films
South African documentary films
Films set in Cape Town